Alrick Kalala (born 31 July 1989) is a French singer-songwriter of Congolese origin previously playing in AS Vitré He also developed a musical career under the artistic name Makassy.

He released his album Tant qu'on respire in 2015 and his EP Écartez-vous in 2017. He is best known in his music career for his hit single "Doucement" that made it to the Top 20 of SNEP, the French official singles chart. A music video of the song was also released through We Made it Entertainment.

Discography

Albums

EPs

Singles

*Did not appear in the official Belgian Ultratop 50 charts, but rather in the bubbling under Ultratip charts.

Other appearances
2012: "Kwasa kwasa" (DJ Smil feat. Makassy)
2015: "El taxi" (Pitbull feat. Makassy & Osmani Garcia)
2016: "Llamame Florina" (Florina Perez feat. Makassy)
2016: "Dangereuse" (Willy William feat. Makassy)

References

French footballers
French male singers
Living people
Association footballers not categorized by position
1989 births